This is a list of properties which have been designated by the City of Ottawa under Part IV of the Ontario Heritage Act as having cultural heritage value or interest. At many properties, a bronze plaque gives a bilingual description of the property's history.

See also
 
List of buildings in Ottawa
List of tallest buildings in Ottawa-Gatineau
List of National Historic Sites of Canada in Ottawa
List of historic places in Ottawa

Notes

References

External links

City of Ottawa Heritage Properties

Heritage registers in Canada
Ottawa
Heritage